Peperomia pernambucensis is a species of plant in the genus Peperomia in the family Piperaceae. Its native range is in Central and South America from Nicaragua to Bolivia.

Synonyms
 Peperomia aphanoneura C. DC.
 Peperomia atirroana Trel.
 Peperomia balsapuertana Trel.
 Peperomia brevicaulis Trel.
 Peperomia breviscapa Trel.
 Peperomia lechleriana Trel.
 Peperomia longifolia C. DC.
 Peperomia lopezensis Trel.
 Peperomia paniculata Regel
 Peperomia subacaulis Trel.

References

pernambucensis
Plants described in 1845